Leah Ilyinichna Zelikhman (1910–1971) was a Soviet pianist and pedagogue.

After studying with Leonid Nikolayev, she taught at the Central Special Music School of the Leningrad Conservatory for many years. Among her pupils were Grigory Sokolov, Valery Sigalevitch, and Pavel Gililov.

References

Citations

Sources 
 

1910 births
1971 deaths
Soviet pianists
Academic staff of Saint Petersburg Conservatory